There have been five baronetcies created for persons with the surname Taylor, one in the Baronetage of England, one in the Baronetage of Great Britain and three in the Baronetage of the United Kingdom. Only one creation is extant as of 2011.

The Taylor Baronetcy, of Park House in the County of Kent, was created in the Baronetage of England on 18 January 1665 for Thomas Taylor. The second Baronet sat as Member of Parliament for Maidstone. The title became extinct on the death of the third Baronet in 1720.

The Taylor Baronetcy, of Lysson Hall in Jamaica, was created in the Baronetage of Great Britain on 1 September 1778 for John Taylor. The title became extinct on the death of the second Baronet in 1815.

The Taylor Baronetcy, of Hollycombe in the County of Sussex, was created in the Baronetage of the United Kingdom on 21 January 1828 for Charles Taylor, for many years Member of Parliament for Wells. The title became extinct on the death of the second Baronet in 1876.

The Taylor, later Stuart Taylor Baronetcy, of Kennington in the County of London, was created in the Baronetage of the United Kingdom on 11 July 1917. For more information on this creation, see Stuart Taylor baronets.

The Taylor Baronetcy, of Cawthorne in the West Riding of the County of York, was created in the Baronetage of the United Kingdom on 26 January 1963 for William Taylor, Member of Parliament for Bradford North. The title became extinct on his death in 1972.

Taylor baronets, of Park House (1665)

Sir Thomas Taylor, 1st Baronet (1630–1665)
Sir Thomas Taylor, 2nd Baronet (1657–1696)
Sir Thomas Taylor, 3rd Baronet (1693–1720)

Taylor baronets, of Lysson Hall (1778)

Sir John Taylor, 1st Baronet (1745–1786)
Sir Simon Richard Brissett Taylor, 2nd Baronet (1783–1815)

Taylor baronets, of Hollycombe (1828)

Sir Charles William Taylor, 1st Baronet (1770–1857)
Sir Charles Taylor, 2nd Baronet (1817–1876)

Taylor, later Stuart Taylor baronets, of Kennington (1917)
see Stuart Taylor Baronets

Taylor baronets, of Cawthorne (1963)
Sir William Johnson Taylor, 1st Baronet (1902–1972)

See also
Worsley-Taylor baronets
Stuart Taylor baronets
Taylour baronets

References

Extinct baronetcies in the Baronetage of England
Extinct baronetcies in the Baronetage of Great Britain
Baronetcies in the Baronetage of the United Kingdom
Extinct baronetcies in the Baronetage of the United Kingdom